Moreland may refer to:

Places 
Australia
 City of Moreland, the previous name of the local government area in Victoria now known as City of Merri-bek
 Moreland railway station

England
 Moreland, Gloucester, an area and electoral ward

United States
 Moreland, Georgia, incorporated municipality in Coweta County, Georgia
 Moreland (Bethesda, Maryland), house on the National Register of Historic Places
 Moreland, Ohio, an unincorporated community
 Moreland Township, Pope County, Arkansas
 Moreland Township, Pennsylvania, in Lycoming County 
 Moreland Township, Philadelphia County, Pennsylvania, a defunct township
 Moreland School District, in San Jose, California

People 
 Moreland (surname)
 Moreland le Blanc (born 1989), Sint Maarten cricketer

Other uses 
 Moreland Buslines, Melbourne, Australia
 Moreland Truck Company, a truck manufacturer from 1917 to 1940 in Burbank, California
 Moreland F.C., a defunct Australian football club
 Moreland Act, enacted by the New York Legislature and signed into law in 1907

See also 
 Lower Moreland Township, Pennsylvania, in Montgomery County
 Upper Moreland Township, Pennsylvania, in Montgomery County
 Moorland (disambiguation)
 Morland (disambiguation)
 Mooreland (disambiguation)